Anthony Joseph Marsden (11 September 1948 – 2010) was an English professional footballer who played as a forward.

References

1948 births
2010 deaths
People from Bolton
English footballers
Association football forwards
Blackpool F.C. players
Doncaster Rovers F.C. players
Grimsby Town F.C. players
Cork Hibernians F.C. players
Bangor City F.C. players
Wigan Athletic F.C. players
English Football League players